Bougainvillea × buttiana is a flowering plant, a garden hybrid of Bougainvillea glabra and Bougainvillea peruviana.

The leaves are ovate and dark green.

This plant can be grown in a warm temperate or subtropical environment where the temperature does not fall below freezing, against a south-facing wall in full sun. Numerous cultivars have been developed, of which the following have gained the Royal Horticultural Society's Award of Garden Merit:
'Miss Manila' 
'Mrs Butt'
'Poulton's Special'

References

External links
Birmingham botanical gardens

Nyctaginaceae
Hybrid plants